All India Muslim Personal Law Board
 All India Shia Personal Law Board
 All India Muslim Women's Personal Law Board